The Black Light Bacchanalia is the twelfth album by New York heavy/power metal group Virgin Steele, released via SPV/Steamhammer on October 22, 2010 in Germany, Austria & Switzerland, and the rest of Europe on October 25, 2010 & on November 9, 2010, in the USA.

The album is issued in CD format, Limited Edition digi-pack (with a bonus CD) and 3.000 copies worldwide boxset (with Triple Lp Vinyl with a book, CD, and extensive packaging).

With a duration of over 11 minutes, "To Crown Them with Halos (Parts 1 & 2)" is the longest track, Virgin Steele have ever recorded.

Track listing
All music and lyrics by David DeFeis

Reception

Personnel

Band members
David DeFeis - all vocals, keyboards, orchestration, bass, producer, engineer
Edward Pursino - 6 string guitars
Josh Block - 7 string guitars, engineer
Frank Gilchriest - drums

Production
Ed Warrin - engineer

References

2010 albums
Virgin Steele albums
Concept albums
SPV/Steamhammer albums